Go Away from Me is a 2006 Spanish film directed by Víctor García León which stars Juan Diego and Juan Diego Botto alongside Cristina Plazas, Rosa María Sardá, Esperanza Roy and José Sazatornil. It was produced by Juan Gona. García León co-wrote the screenplay with Jonás Trueba. The film received two Goya Award nominations, winning one award (Best Actor).

Plot 
The plot follows the dysfunctional relationship between two markedly selfish individuals, Santiago (an aging thespian) and Guillermo (the former's freeloading son).

Cast

Production 
A Gona Cine y TV production, the film was shot in Madrid, even if most of the production crew was from Asturias.

Release 
The film screened at the 54th San Sebastián International Film Festival in September 2006. Soon after, on 29 September, it opened in Spanish theatres.

Reception 
Deborah Young of Variety presented the film (a "bitter satire") as "a surprisingly classical piece of filmmaking boasting solidity, but little edge", assessing it to be "entertaining, occasionally poignant".

Mirito Torreiro of Fotogramas gave the film 4 out of 5 stars, drawing out the acting duel between the two Juan Diegos as the best thing about the film.

Accolades

|-
| align = "center" | 2006 || 54th San Sebastián International Film Festival || Silver Shell for Best Actor || Juan Diego ||  || align = "center" | 
|-
| align = "center" rowspan = "5" | 2007 || CEC Medals || Best Actor || Juan Diego ||  || align = "center" | 
|-
| rowspan = "2" | 21st Goya Awards || Best Actor || Juan Diego ||  || rowspan = "2" | 
|-
| Best Supporting Actor || Juan Diego Botto || 
|-
| rowspan = "2" | 16th Actors and Actresses Union Awards || Best Film Actor in a Leading Role || Juan Diego ||  || rowspan = "2" | 
|-
| Best Film Actor in a Secondary Role || Juan Diego Botto || 
|}

See also 
 List of Spanish films of 2006

References

External links
 

2006 films
2000s Spanish-language films
Spanish drama films
Films featuring a Best Actor Goya Award-winning performance
Films shot in Madrid
Films directed by Víctor García León
2000s Spanish films